Abalakovo is a rural locality (a selo) in Nizhneudinsky District, Irkutsk Oblast, Russia. The population was 114 as of 2010. There are 3 streets.

Geography 
Abalakovo is located 21 km south of Nizhneudinsk (the district's administrative centre) by road. Solontsy is the nearest rural locality.

References 

Rural localities in Irkutsk Oblast